Monastir Habib Bourguiba International Airport (AIMHB)  is an airport serving Monastir and Sousse areas in Tunisia. The Tunisian Civil Aviation and Airports Authority (OACA) awarded the management of the airport to TAV Airports Holding in March 2007. The airport is named after the former president Habib Bourguiba, who was born in Monastir.

History
During World War II, the airport was known as Monastir Airfield and was used by the United States Army Air Forces Twelfth Air Force 81st Fighter Group during the North African Campaign. The 81st flew P-39 Airacobras from the airfield between 26 May and 10 August 1943.

Overview
The airport activity mainly serves tourists coming to visit Monastir, Sousse and the surrounding resorts (Monastir-Skanes and Port El Kantaoui in particular). Almost all charter flights are concentrated within the tourist season. The main airlines operating currently at the airport are Nouvelair and Tunisair. With a capacity of 3.5 million passengers per year, the terminal covers 28,000 m2. The airport led the country in terms of traffic with 4,279,802 passengers in 2007.

Like all Tunisian airports, the airport was originally managed by the Office of Civil Aviation and Airports (OACA). However, in January 2008, it came under the management of the Turkish consortium TAV Airports Holding for a period of 40 years, under the concession.

Airlines and destinations
The following airlines operate regular scheduled and charter flights at Monastir Airport:

Access
The airport is served by trains on the electrified, metre-gauge Sahel Metro line and between Sousse and Gare Habib Bourguiba Monastir.

References

Citations

Bibliography
 Maurer, Maurer. Air Force Combat Units of World War II. Maxwell AFB, Alabama: Office of Air Force History, 1983. .

External links
 Tunisia Monastir International Airport – official site
 Tunisian Civil Aviation and Airports Authority (OACA)
 
 

Airports in Tunisia
Airfields of the United States Army Air Forces in Tunisia
Airports established in 1968